Ahmet Çalık is a Turkish businessman who is the chairman of Çalık Holding. He was made a government minister in Turkmenistan by Saparmurat Niyazov.

He is married with four children and lives in Istanbul.

According to Forbes, his fortune amounts to $1.34 billion in 2018. His name is in the Pandora Papers for trading with four off-shore companies. Also, he has a sign in one of documents for one of the companies which reveals his relation with the tax haven.

See also 
 List of Turks by net worth

References

Living people
Turkish businesspeople
Turkish billionaires
Turkish mass media owners
1958 births